Ernst Waldfried Josef Wenzel Mach (18 February 1838 – 19 February 1916) was an Austrian physicist and philosopher, who contributed to the physics of shock waves. The ratio of one's speed to that of sound is named the Mach number in his honour. As a philosopher of science, he was a major influence on logical positivism and American pragmatism. Through his criticism of Newton's theories of space and time, he foreshadowed Einstein's theory of relativity.

Biography
Mach was born in Chrlice, Moravia, Austrian Empire (now part of Brno in the Czech Republic). His father, who had graduated from Charles-Ferdinand University in Prague, acted as tutor to the noble Brethon family in Zlín in eastern Moravia. His grandfather, Wenzl Lanhaus, an administrator of the Chirlitz estate, was also master builder of the streets there. His activities in that field later influenced Ernst Mach's theoretical work. Some sources give Mach's birthplace as Tuřany (now also part of Brno), the site of the Chirlitz registry-office. It was there that Mach was baptised by Peregrin Weiss. Mach later became a socialist and an atheist, but his theory and life was sometimes compared to Buddhism. Heinrich Gomperz called Mach the "Buddha of Science" due to his phenomenalist approach to the "Ego" in his Analysis of Sensations.

Up to the age of 14, Mach was educated at home by his parents. He then entered a Gymnasium in Kroměříž, where he studied for three years. In 1855 he became a student at the University of Vienna. There he studied physics and for one semester medical physiology, receiving his doctorate in physics in 1860 under Andreas von Ettingshausen with a thesis titled Über elektrische Ladungen und Induktion, and his habilitation the following year. His early work focused on the Doppler effect in optics and acoustics. In 1864, he took a job as professor of mathematics at the University of Graz, having turned down the position of a chair in surgery at the University of Salzburg to do so, and in 1866 he was appointed professor of physics. During that period, Mach continued his work in psycho-physics and in sensory perception. In 1867, he took the chair of experimental physics at the Charles-Ferdinand University, where he stayed for 28 years before returning to Vienna.

Mach's main contribution to physics involved his description and photographs of spark shock-waves and then ballistic shock-waves. He described how when a bullet or shell moved faster than the speed of sound, it created a compression of air in front of it. Using schlieren photography, he and his son Ludwig photographed the shadows of the invisible shock waves. During the early 1890s Ludwig invented a modification of the Jamin interferometer that allowed for much clearer photographs. But Mach also made many contributions to psychology and physiology, including his anticipation of gestalt phenomena, his discovery of the oblique effect and of Mach bands, an inhibition-influenced type of visual illusion, and especially his discovery of a non-acoustic function of the inner ear that helps control human balance.

One of the best-known of Mach's ideas is the so-called "Mach principle", concerning the physical origin of inertia. This was never written down by Mach, but was given a graphic verbal form, attributed by Philipp Frank to Mach himself, as, "When the subway jerks, it's the fixed stars that throw you down."

Mach also became well known for his philosophy, developed in close interplay with his science. Mach defended a type of phenomenalism recognizing only sensations as real. This position seemed incompatible with the view of atoms and molecules as external, mind-independent things. He famously declared, after an 1897 lecture by Ludwig Boltzmann at the Imperial Academy of Science in Vienna: "I don't believe that atoms exist!" From about 1908 to 1911, Max Planck criticized Mach's reluctance to acknowledge the reality of atoms as incompatible with physics. Einstein's 1905 demonstration that the statistical fluctuations of atoms allowed measurement of their existence without direct individuated sensory evidence marked a turning point in the acceptance of atomic theory. Some of Mach's criticisms of Newton's position on space and time influenced Einstein, but later Einstein realized that Mach was basically opposed to Newton's philosophy and concluded that his physical criticism was not sound.

In 1898 Mach survived a paralytic stroke, and in 1901 he retired from the University of Vienna and was appointed to the upper chamber of the Austrian parliament. On leaving Vienna in 1913, he moved to his son's home in Vaterstetten, near Munich, where he continued writing and corresponding until his death in 1916, one day after his 78th birthday.

Physics
Most of Mach's initial studies in experimental physics concentrated on the interference, diffraction, polarization and refraction of light in different media under external influences. From there followed explorations in supersonic fluid mechanics. Mach and physicist-photographer Peter Salcher presented their paper on this subject in 1887; it correctly describes the sound effects observed during the supersonic motion of a projectile. They deduced and experimentally confirmed the existence of a shock wave of conical shape, with the projectile at the apex. The ratio of the speed of a fluid to the local speed of sound vp/vs is now called the Mach number. It is a critical parameter in the description of high-speed fluid movement in aerodynamics and hydrodynamics. Mach also contributed to cosmology the hypothesis known as Mach's principle.

Philosophy of science

Empirio-criticism
From 1895 to 1901, Mach held a newly created chair for "the history and philosophy of the inductive sciences" at the University of Vienna. In his historico-philosophical studies, Mach developed a phenomenalistic philosophy of science that became influential in the 19th and 20th centuries. He originally saw scientific laws as summaries of experimental events, constructed for the purpose of making complex data comprehensible, but later emphasized mathematical functions as a more useful way to describe sensory appearances. Thus, scientific laws, while somewhat idealized, have more to do with describing sensations than with reality as it exists beyond sensations.

Mach's positivism also influenced many Russian Marxists, such as Alexander Bogdanov. In 1908, Lenin wrote a philosophical work, Materialism and Empirio-criticism, in which he criticized Machism and the views of "Russian Machists". His main criticisms were that Mach's philosophy led to solipsism and to the absurd conclusion that nature did not exist before humans:

Empirio-criticism is the term for the rigorously positivist and radically empiricist philosophy established by the German philosopher Richard Avenarius and further developed by Mach, which claims that all we can know is our sensations and that knowledge should be confined to pure experience.

In accordance with empirio-critical philosophy, Mach opposed Ludwig Boltzmann and others who proposed an atomic theory of physics. Since one cannot observe things as small as atoms directly, and since no atomic model at the time was consistent, the atomic hypothesis seemed unwarranted to Mach, and perhaps not sufficiently "economical". Mach had a direct influence on the Vienna Circle philosophers and logical positivism in general.

To Mach are attributed a number of principles that distill his ideal of physical theorisation—what is now called "Machian physics":
 It should be based entirely on directly observable phenomena (in line with his positivistic leanings)
 It should completely eschew absolute space and time in favor of relative motion
 Any phenomena that seem attributable to absolute space and time (e.g., inertia and centrifugal force) should instead be seen as emerging from the distribution of matter in the universe.

The last is singled out, particularly by Einstein, as "the" Mach's principle. Einstein cited it as one of the three principles underlying general relativity. In 1930, he wrote, "it is justified to consider Mach as the precursor of the general theory of relativity", though Mach, before his death, apparently rejected Einstein's theory. Einstein was aware that his theories did not fulfill all Mach's principles, and no subsequent theory has either, despite considerable effort.

Phenomenological constructivism
According to Alexander Riegler, Mach's work was a precursor to the influential perspective known as constructivism. Constructivism holds that all knowledge is constructed rather than received by the learner. He took an exceptionally non-dualist, phenomenological position. The founder of radical constructivism, von Glasersfeld, gave a nod to Mach as an ally.

Physiology
In 1873, independently of each other, Mach and the physiologist and physician Josef Breuer discovered how the sense of balance (i.e., the perception of the head's imbalance) functions, tracing its management by information the brain receives from the movement of a fluid in the semicircular canals of the inner ear. That the sense of balance depends on the three semicircular canals was discovered in 1870 by the physiologist Friedrich Goltz, but Goltz did not discover how the balance-sensing apparatus functions. Mach devised a swivel chair to test his theories, and Floyd Ratliff has suggested that this experiment may have paved the way to Mach's critique of a physical conception of absolute space and motion.

Psychology

In the area of sensory perception, psychologists remember Mach for the optical illusion called Mach bands. The effect exaggerates the contrast between edges of the slightly differing shades of gray as soon as they touch, by triggering edge-detection in the human visual system.

More clearly than anyone before or since, Mach made the distinction between what he called physiological (specifically visual) and geometrical spaces.

Mach's views on mediating structures inspired B. F. Skinner's strongly inductive position, which paralleled Mach's in the field of psychology.

Eponyms
In homage his name was given to:
 3949 Mach, an asteroid
 Mach, a lunar crater
 Mach bands, an optical illusion
 Mach diamonds, seen in supersonic exhausts
 Mach Five, the car used by Speed Racer
 Mach number, the unit for speed relative to the speed of sound

Bibliography

 
 
 
 
 

Mach's principal works in English:
 
  with Peter Slacher
 
 Popular Scientific Lectures (1895); Revised & enlarged 3rd edition (1898)
  with S.J.B. Sugden
 History and Root of the Principle of the Conservation of Energy (1911)
 The Principles of Physical Optics (1926)
 Knowledge and Error (1976)
 Principles of the Theory of Heat (1986)
 Fundamentals of the Theory of Movement Perception (2001)

See also

 Energeticism
 Mach_(kernel)
 Mach bands
 Mach disk
 Mach reflection
 Mach's principle
 Mach–Zehnder interferometer
 Stereokinetic stimulus
 Visual space

References

Notes

Citations

Sources

Further reading

 Erik C. Banks: Ernst Mach's World Elements. A Study in Natural Philosophy. Dordrecht: Kluwer (now Springer), 2013.
 John Blackmore and Klaus Hentschel (eds.): Ernst Mach als Außenseiter. Vienna: Braumüller, 1985 (with select correspondence).
 
 John T. Blackmore, Ryoichi Itagaki and Setsuko Tanaka (eds.): Ernst Mach's Science. Kanagawa: Tokai University Press, 2006.
 John T. Blackmore, Ryoichi Itagaki and Setsuko Tanaka: Ernst Mach's Influence Spreads. Bethesda: Sentinel Open Press, 2009.
 John T. Blackmore, Ryoichi Itagaki and Setsuko Tanaka: Ernst Mach's Graz (1864–1867), where much science and philosophy were developed. Bethesda: Sentinel Open Press, 2010.
 John T. Blackmore: Ernst Mach's Prague 1867–1895 as a human adventure, Bethesda: Sentinel Open Press, 2010.
 
 
 
 
 

 
  (with select correspondence).

External links

 Ernst Mach bibliography of all of his papers and books from 1860 to 1916, compiled by Vienna lecturer Dr. Peter Mahr in 2016
 Various Ernst Mach links, compiled by Greg C Elvers
 Klaus Hentschel: Mach, Ernst, in: Neue Deutsche Biographie 15 (1987), pp. 605–609.
 
 
 
 
 Short biography and bibliography in the Virtual Laboratory of the Max Planck Institute for the History of Science
 Ernst Mach: The Analysis of Sensations (1897) [translation of Beiträge zur Analyse der Empfindungen (1886)]
 
 "The critical positivism of Mach and Avenarius": entry in the Britannica Online Encyclopedia

1838 births
1916 deaths
19th-century Austrian writers
19th-century Austrian philosophers
19th-century Czech philosophers
20th-century Austrian writers
20th-century Austrian philosophers
19th-century Austrian physicists
Historians of physics
Austrian atheists
Austrian people of Moravian-German descent
Austrian socialists
Ballistics experts
Academic staff of Charles University
Empiricists
Experimental physicists
Fluid dynamicists
Historians of science
Optical physicists
People from the Margraviate of Moravia
Philosophers of science
Positivists
Scientists from Brno